Skene IF is a Swedish football club in Skene in Mark Municipality, Västra Götaland County.

Background
Skene Idrottsförening was founded in 1921 thanks to Borås Cotton who provided land for a football field. The club's first committee comprised  Torsten Lydén, the club's first chairman, along with  Knut Hultin and Sven Andersson. In 1942, again thanks to Borås Cotton, the Skene sports ground was developed into a fully modern facility with the new name Vävarevallen.

Since their foundation Skene IF has participated mainly in the middle divisions of the Swedish football league system.  The club currently plays in Division 3 Mellersta Götaland which is the fifth tier of Swedish football but have finished in a relegation position. They play their home matches at the Vävarevallen in Skene.  The home match against Viken in 1948 was attended by 2,120 spectators but the attendance record for a football match at Vävarevallen was set in 2003 when 2,259 attended the youth international match between Sweden and England.

Skene IF are affiliated to the Västergötlands Fotbollförbund.

Season to season

Attendances

In recent seasons Skene IF have had the following average attendances:

Footnotes

External links
 Skene IF – Official website
 Skene IF – Football team website
 Skene IF Facebook

Football clubs in Västra Götaland County
Association football clubs established in 1921
1921 establishments in Sweden